The 783d Bombardment Squadron was activated in 1943.  After organizing and training with Consolidated B-24 Liberators in the United States. it served in combat in the Mediterranean Theater of Operations as a heavy bomber unit  in the strategic bombing campaign against Germany.  The squadron earned two Distinguished Unit Citations for its actions.  After V-E Day, the squadron served in Air Transport Command, ferrying men from the combat theater back to the United States until inactivating in July 1945.

History
The squadron was first activated at Alamogordo Army Air Field, New Mexico as the 783d Bombardment Squadron, one of the four original Consolidated B-24 Liberator heavy bomber squadrons of the 465th Bombardment Group.  After training under Second Air Force, the squadron deployed to the Mediterranean Theater of Operations in February 1944.

The squadron arrived in the Mediterranean Theater of Operations, where it was stationed at Pantanella Airfield, Italy in March 1944.  The air echelon halted in Tunisia for additional training before completing its move to Italy, where it became part of Fifteenth Air Force. It flew strategic bombardment combat missions over France, Germany, Italy, Austria and the Balkans, attacking targets such as marshalling yards, docks, aircraft factories and oil production facilities.  On 8 July 1944 the squadron attacked an oil refinery and marshalling yards near Vienna, Austria despite heavy flak and fighter opposition, earning the unit a Distinguished Unit Citation.  It was awarded a second citation for an attack on 3 August 1944 against a steel plant in Friedrichshafen, Germany.

The squadron was occasionally diverted from the strategic campaign.  It attacked troop concentrations in May 1944 to assist partisan forces in Yugoslavia and performed interdiction missions to support the advance on Rome.  Prior to Operation Dragoon, the invasion of southern France, it attacked bridges, railroads and gun emplacements near the landing area.  It supported Red Army and Romanian Army forces advancing in the Balkans in October 1944 and Allied forces in Northern Italy in April 1945.

The squadron moved to Waller Field, Trinidad and became part of Air Transport Command in June 1945. It used its Liberators as transports, flying personnel from Trinidad to Florida. The unit was inactivated in Trinidad during July 1945. The squadron was redesignated as very heavy bomber squadron in 1945, but remained inactive.

Lineage
 Constituted as the 783d Bombardment Squadron, Heavy'' on 19 May 1943
 Activated on 1 August 1943
 Inactivated on 31 July 1945

Assignments
 465th Bombardment Group, 1 August 1943 – 31 July 1945

Stations
 Alamogordo Army Air Field, New Mexico, 1 August 1943
 Kearns Army Air Base, Utah, c. 13 September 1943
 McCook Army Air Field, Nebraska, c. 5 October 1943 – 1 February 1944
 Pantanella Airfield, Italy, 15 March 1944 – June 1945
 Waller Field, Trinidad, c. 15 June – 31 July 1945

Aircraft
 Consolidated B-24 Liberator, 1943–1945

Awards and campaigns

References

Notes
 Explanatory notes

 Citations

Bibliography

 
 
 

Bombardment squadrons of the United States Army Air Forces
Military units and formations established in 1943
World War II strategic bombing units